James Stewart (1885 – 28 July 1960) was a Scottish footballer who played as an inside right. Stewart played for Motherwell before he joined Liverpool in 1909. He made his English Football League debut at the start of the 1909–10 season and played every match bar one, as Liverpool finished as runners-up. He scored 18 goals during his debut season, but he was unable to replicate this form over the following seasons as he only made a further 25 appearances in the next four seasons. He left Liverpool in 1913 and returned to Scotland to play for Hamilton Academical. He later worked as a trainer (assisted in some cases by his son of the same name) at clubs including Hamilton, Blackpool, Dundee and Portsmouth.

References

1885 births
Date of birth missing
1960 deaths
Scottish footballers
Association football inside forwards
Association football coaches
Motherwell F.C. players
Liverpool F.C. players
Hamilton Academical F.C. players
Dumbarton F.C. players
King's Park F.C. players
Broxburn United F.C. players
Forfar Athletic F.C. players
English Football League players
Hamilton Academical F.C. non-playing staff
Blackpool F.C. non-playing staff
Dundee F.C. non-playing staff
Portsmouth F.C. non-playing staff
Sportspeople from Dumbarton
Footballers from West Dunbartonshire